Fuman ( Fuman) is the capital of Fuman County in Gilan Province, Iran. At to the 2006 census, its population was 27,763 in 7,728 families.

Rice has been cultivated in this region for many years, where some indigenous cultivars were conventionally bred by farmers. Fuman also produces popular cookies known as koluche. Fuman's koluche is thinner and larger than its brethren in Lahijan.

The city is also known for its statues, including the statue of the ancient Iranian goddess Anahita and the statue of the Four Girls.

Location
Fuman is only 21 kilometres to the west-southwest of Rasht, and 356 kilometres away from the national capital Tehran. It is situated near the foothills of the Talysh Highlands. Fuman is on the road to the historical city of Masuleh and as a result receives a sizeable number of tourists.

History
From 660 to 760, Fuman functioned as the seat of the Zoroastrian Dabuyid rulers. During the period of the Mongol occupation of Iran, Fuman and Lahijan were among the main towns of Gilan. The local ruler of Fuman at that time, who was reportedly the "only Shafi'ite among the rulers of Gilan", was able to generate a large amount of revenue through lucrative silk trade. According to Hamdallah Mustawfi (died 1349), Fuman was a large city, and the center of a wealthy region which produced large quantities of "wheat, rice and silk".

Fuman continued to function as the capital of the Bia-pas region (western Gilan) until 1572–1573, when ruler Jamshid Soltan made Rasht the capital. From the reign of King (Shah) Sultan Husayn (1694–1722) to Fath-Ali Shah Qajar (1797–1834), the local rulers of Fuman were involved in a fierce rivalry with the local rulers of neighboring Shaft. John Elton, who had been prominent under Nader Shah (1736–1747), was killed in 1751 on the order of one of these rulers, Agha Jamal Fumani. In 1805, during the reign of Fath-Ali Shah Qajar, Fuman was reportedly "still a small, open town with about a thousand houses and a very lively market". However, the situation changed when Hajji Mohammad Khan abandoned Fuman for Rasht during the early reign of Naser al-Din Shah Qajar (1848–1896). In the subsequent period, Fuman "fell into decay". According to Grigorii Melgunov, who visited Fuman in 1860, it was little more than a village consisting of just 140 houses surrounding the palace of the local ruler. Fuman has regained importance since the mid-20th century.

Demographics
The majority of the inhabitants are Shia Muslims, with a minority of Sunnis present in the city.

The Inhabitants of Fouman are mostly Gilaks and they speak Foumani variety of Western Gilaki language.

Linguistic composition of the city.

Sports
Football is the most popular sport in Fuman, and the city is host to Shahrdari Fuman who play in the Iranian third tier.

Gallery

Notes

References

Sources
 
 

Populated places in Fuman County
Cities in Gilan Province

Talysh settlements in Gilan Province

Gilak settlements in Gilan Province